One from the Heart is a soundtrack album of Tom Waits compositions for the Francis Ford Coppola film of the same name. It was recorded from October 1980 to September 1981. It was during this period that Waits met his wife Kathleen Brennan, an employee at the studio where it was recorded. While the film was released in February, the soundtrack album release was delayed until October of 1982 due to a dispute between Columbia Records and Coppola's Zoetrope Studios.

Crystal Gayle sings on the record, performing either solo or in duets with Waits. The soundtrack was nominated for an Academy Award for Original Music Score.

The movie was re-released on DVD on January 27, 2004, and the DVD contains remixed and remastered Dolby Digital 5.1 Surround Sound of the soundtrack from Waits' original studio sessions, a documentary on the making of the soundtrack, as well as previously unreleased demo recordings and alternate takes.

Production 
The album was the last in an almost decade-long collaboration between Waits and producer Bones Howe. Howe recounts how Waits broke the news to him: "He called me up and said 'Can we have a drink?' He told me he realised one night that as he was writing a song, he found himself asking 'If I write this, will Bones like it?' I said to him that we were getting to be kind of like an old married couple. I said I don't want to be the reason that an artist can't create. It was time for him to find another producer. We shook hands and that was it. It was a great ride."

Critical reception
The Austin Chronicle wrote: "Of course Waits fans might chafe at the Crystal clarity of the country music siren's ringing cry, but like the last and best duet on the soundtrack explains, 'This One's From the Heart'."

Track listing 
All tracks written by Tom Waits.

Side One

Side Two

2004 reissue - previously unreleased bonus tracks

Personnel
Tom Waits - vocals, piano, orchestral arrangements

Musicians
 Bob Alcivar – piano, orchestral arrangement, conductor
 Ronnie Barron – organ on "Little Boy Blue"
 Dennis Budimir – guitar on "Opening Montage" and "Old Boyfriends"
 Larry Bunker – drums on "The Tango"
 Gene Cipriano – tenor saxophone on "The Tango"
 Greg Cohen – bass
 Teddy Edwards – tenor saxophone
 Victor Feldman – timpani on "You Can't Unring a Bell"
 Chuck Findley – trumpet on "Circus Girl"
 Crystal Gayle – vocals
 Dick Hyde – trombone on "Circus Girl"
 Pete Jolly – piano, accordion, celeste
 Gayle Levant – harp
 John Lowe – woodwind on "Circus Girl"
 Shelly Manne – drums on "Opening Montage", "Is There Any Way Out of This Dream?" and "Old Boyfriends"
 Lonny Morgan – woodwind
 Joe Porcaro – glockenspiel on "Presents"
 Emil Richards – vibes on "I Beg Your Pardon"
 Jack Sheldon – trumpet
 John Thomassie – percussion on "Little Boy Blue"
 Leslie Thompson – harmonica on "Circus Girl"
 Don Waldrop – tuba on "Instrumental Montage"

Technical personnel
 Bones Howe – producer, sound, engineer, remixer
 Biff Dawes – engineer
 Tim Boyle – second engineer
 Dave Demore – second engineer
 Bob Winder – second engineer
 Richard Beggs – sound montages
 Kathy Morton – sound assistant

References

External links 
 Tom Waits perspective at Tom Waits Library

Crystal Gayle albums
Musical film soundtracks
Collaborative albums
1982 soundtrack albums
Tom Waits soundtracks
CBS Records soundtracks
Albums produced by Bones Howe